Louis Walton Sipley (April 10, 1897 - October 18, 1968) was a writer, inventor museum proprietor and an author of books on photography. His museum's collection of photographs and his papers were donated to the George Eastman Museum which has a collection and conservation center named for him. The museum of photography he established was the first of its kind. He also created a hall of fame at it for photography innovators and pioneers.

He was part of the Bucknell University class of 1918.

With his wife Alice Gertrude Moïse (May 24, 1906 - April 26, 2003), he directed the American Museum of Photography in Philadelphia.

A collection of his work and papers was donated to the George Eastman Museum by 3M in 1977.

He reviewed an art book.

He is buried in a Jewish cemetery.

Bibliography
A half century of color by Louis Walton Sipley (1951)
Photography's great inventors by Louis Walton Sipley (1965)
A collector's guide to American photography by Louis Walton Sipley (1957)
The photomechanical halftone by Louis Walton Sipley (1958)
Frederic E. Ives, photo-graphic-arts inventor by Louis Walton Sipley (1956) 
Paintings by later American artists by Louis Walton Sipley (1939)
Mempirs of a Photochemist written by Fritz Wentzel and edited by Sipley
Pennsylvania Arts and Sciences (editor)

Further reading
Book review in PDF format of one of his works
"The Magic Lantern Slide" by Louis Walton Sipley, Pennsylvania Arts and Sciences, v. 4, no. 1, 1939, pp. 39–43 +

References

External links
Findagrave entry

1897 births
1968 deaths